"Self Esteem" is a song by the American punk rock band The Offspring. It is the eighth track and second single from their third studio album, Smash. The song was a worldwide hit, reaching number one in Iceland, Norway and Sweden. "Self Esteem" was nominated for the 1995 MTV Europe Music Awards for Best Song. The song also appears as the third track on their Greatest Hits (2005).

Critical reception
Music & Media commented, "Coming out once more to play the role of Nirvana's perfect replacement, Offspring delivers the punky action so sadly missed on rock radio because of Seattlers who take themselves way too seriously." In 2012, Loudwire ranked the song number four on their list of the 10 greatest Offspring songs, and in 2021, Kerrang ranked the song number two on their list of the 20 greatest Offspring songs.

Music video
The music video for the song was directed by Darren Lavett (who directed the previous video, "Come Out and Play") and was shot in August 1994 after the Offspring had just gone both gold and platinum with Smash. In the music video several people are doing stunts, intercut with shots of the band playing on stage.

In the video, Dexter Holland wears three different band T-shirts. Initially, he wears a Sex Pistols T-shirt. Later he dons a T-shirt of the Germs, and then a Vandals T-shirt when he briefly appears as a human skeleton.

In an interview on The Offspring's Greatest Hits DVD, Noodles claimed that he gave his Fender Stratocaster (which he played in the videos for "Come Out and Play" and "Self Esteem") to one of the actors who appeared in the video.

"Self Esteem" remains one of The Offspring's popular videos. Its popularity on MTV helped launch the song to success on mainstream radio. According to Nielsen Music's year-end report for 2019, "Self Esteem" was the sixth most-played song of the decade on mainstream rock radio with 131,000 spins. All of the songs in the top 10 were from the 1990s.

DVD appearances
The music video also appears on the Complete Music Video Collection DVD. It was released in 2005.

Track listings
CD single, 7" blue and 12" black vinyl

CD maxi

Charts

Weekly charts

Year-end charts

Decade-end charts

Certifications

Other appearances
On July 20, 2018, 311 released a "reggaefied" cover of the song, which 311's lead singer Nick Hexum said is "probably my favorite song of theirs." On the same day, The Offspring released a cover of 311's "Down". Those cover versions coincided with the beginning of their 2018 Never Ending Summer co-tour. 
The song was covered by Steve 'N' Seagulls in 2016.
The song was released as downloadable content for the video game Rock Band, in the "Offspring pack" which was released on October 7, 2008, along with "Gone Away" and "Pretty Fly (For a White Guy)". It also appears in SingStar Rocks!, Guitar Hero: Warriors of Rock and The Darkness II.  An upgraded version of the song was made available to download on March 1, 2011, for use in the Rock Band 3 music gaming platform in both Basic rhythm, and PRO mode which takes advantage of the use of a real guitar / bass guitar, along with standard MIDI-compatible electronic drum kits / keyboards in addition to up to three-part harmony vocals.
In the 2015 film Daddy's Home, Brad is shown skateboarding with this song in the background, then passes out.

References

External links

1994 singles
The Offspring songs
Songs about drugs
Drinking songs
Songs written by Dexter Holland
Number-one singles in Iceland
Number-one singles in Norway
Number-one singles in Sweden
1994 songs
Epitaph Records singles
Torch songs
Grunge songs